The Kanak and Socialist National Liberation Front (FLNKS) is a pro-independence alliance of political parties in New Caledonia. It was founded in 1984 at a congress of various political parties. Its supporters are mostly from the Kanak indigenous population but also include supporters from other ethnic communities.

History
It is composed of the Caledonian Union (UC) (a centre-left formerly multi-ethnic party dating back to the early postwar period) on the one hand and the National Union for Independence (UNI) on the other. The UNI includes Melanesian Progressive Union (a political movement based on the island's west coast and mainly around the village of Poya, where its founder, the late Edmond Nekiriai, came from), the Oceanian Democratic Rally (a Polynesian (Wallisian-and-Futunian) based party) and the Party of Kanak Liberation (PALIKA), a more radical party founded by left-leaning students that came back from France after the May 1968 riots. Both the UC and UNI are of approximately equal size, and with varying rhetoric. However, all support the independence of New Caledonia. The party boycotted the 1987 independence referendum.

The party has been divided since the early 1990s between the Caledonian Union and UNI, and, as a result, the two factions often run candidates and lists against each other and neither can agree on a leader of the FLNKS. The coalition only has a spokesperson, Victor Tutugoro.

An attempt to re-unite the party was made on the occasion of the 2007 legislative elections in France, in which both New Caledonian constituencies were up for election. In New Caledonia's 1st constituency, Charles Washetine, a member of UNI-Palika, ran with a Caledonian Union running mate. In New Caledonia's 2nd constituency, the leader of the Caledonian Union, Charles Pidjot, ran with a UNI-Palika running mate. However, both were defeated by the candidates of The Rally-UMP.

The FLNKS ran a common list in the South Province in the 2009 election which obtained 8.82% and 4 seats in the province. In the province during the 2004 elections, the pro-independence faction was divided and did not win any seats.

Presidents
Jean-Marie Tjibaou (1984–1989)
Paul Néaoutyine (1989–1995)
Roch Wamytan (1995–2001)

See also

 Ouvéa cave hostage taking
 Ilaïsaane Lauouvéa

References

1984 establishments in New Caledonia
Left-wing nationalist parties
Left-wing political party alliances
Melanesian socialism
Political parties established in 1984
Political parties in New Caledonia
Political party alliances in France
Secessionist organizations
Separatism in France
Socialist parties in New Caledonia